is a Japanese female professional golfer.

Oyama plays on the LPGA of Japan Tour where she has won 17 times and led the money list in 2006. She played on the LPGA Tour in 2009.

Oyama competed for Japan at the 2016 Summer Olympics, finishing 42nd.

Professional wins

LPGA of Japan Tour wins (18)

Tournaments in bold denotes major tournaments in LPGA of Japan Tour.

Other wins
2011 Hitachi 3Tours Championship
2014 Hitachi 3Tours Championship
2015 Hitachi 3Tours Championship

Team appearances
Professional
The Queens (representing Japan): 2015 (winners), 2016

References

External links

Yahoo Sports profile

Japanese female golfers
LPGA of Japan Tour golfers
LPGA Tour golfers
Olympic golfers of Japan
Golfers at the 2016 Summer Olympics
Sportspeople from Miyazaki Prefecture
1977 births
Living people
21st-century Japanese women